Ropalopus sanguinicollis is a species of long-horned beetle in the family Cerambycidae. It is found in the northeastern United States and southern Canada.

References

Further reading

 

Callidiini
Beetles described in 1860